Troy Wilford Melton (March 2, 1921 – November 15, 1995)
was an American stuntman and actor.

Early life
Born in Jackson, Tennessee, Melton migrated with his family to Los Angeles during the Great Depression. After three years of service in the Army Air Corps during World War II, Melton began picking up acting and stunt work in the late 1940s and early 1950s.

Career

Melton is one of the founding members of the Stuntmen's Association of Motion Pictures, and his career spanned over 40 years. Notable actors for whom Melton doubled include Roy Rogers, James Colburn, Richard Webb, Gregory Walcott, Duncan Renaldo in The Cisco Kid, Kent Taylor in Boston Blackie and The Rough Riders, and Martin Landau in Mission: Impossible.

Death

Melton died in November 1995 of cancer at a hospital in Los Angeles, California, at the age of 74.

Filmography
A partial filmography follows.

Film

 The Day Mars Invaded Earth (1962)

 Young Guns of Texas (1962)

 Cyborg 2087 (1966) as Tracer #2

 Blazing Saddles (1974)

Television

 The Dukes of Hazzard (1979-1984)
 Father Murphy (1982)
 Little House on the Prairie (1975-1980)
 The Six Million Dollar Man (1974-1975)
 Mission: Impossible (1973)
 Columbo (1972)
 Mannix (1968-1972)
 Bonanza (1959-1972)
 Mod Squad (1968-1969)
 Gunsmoke (1966-1974):
 The Town Tamers (1974) as a Townsman (uncredited)
 The Fugitives (1972) as Curly Danzig
 The Wedding (1972) as Pete Calder
 Captain Sligo (1971) as Rackley
 Celia (1970) as 2nd Driver
 The Devil's Outpost (1969) as Mike Lennox
 Railroad! (1968) as Railroad Worker (uncredited)
 9:12 to Dodge (1968) as Miles
 O'Quillian (1968) as Brawler (uncredited)
 Blood Money (1968) as Jake Walker
 The Favor (1967) as Stage Driver
 The Lure (1967) as Hennington
 The Returning (1967) as Barton
 Champion of the World (1966) as Zac
 The Big Valley (1965-1968)
 Laredo (1965-1967)
 The Outer Limits (1964)
 Rawhide (1964)
 The Rifleman (1961-1962)
 The Twilight Zone (1962)
 Sea Hunt (1958-1961)
 Bat Masterson (1958-1961)
 Rough Riders (1958-1959)
 The Life and Legend of Wyatt Earp (1957-1961)
 Zane Grey Theatre (1957-1958)
 Maverick (1957-1958)
 The Roy Rogers Show (1956-1957)
 Boston Blackie (1951-1952)
 The Cisco Kid (1950-1955)

References

External links 

Troy Melton at Turner Classic Movies

1921 births
1995 deaths
American stunt performers
People from Jackson, Tennessee
American male film actors
American male television actors
20th-century American male actors
Deaths from cancer in California